The French Revolutionary and Napoleonic Wars, sometimes called  the Great French War, were a series of conflicts between the French and several European monarchies between 1792 and 1815.  They encompass first the French Revolutionary Wars against the newly declared French Republic and from 1803 onwards the Napoleonic Wars against First Consul and later Emperor Napoleon Bonaparte. They include the Coalition Wars as a subset: seven wars waged by various military alliances of great European powers, known as Coalitions, against Revolutionary France – later the First French Empire – and its allies between 1792 and 1815:

 War of the First Coalition (April 1792 – October 1797)
 War of the Second Coalition (November 1798 – March 1802)
 War of the Third Coalition (April 1805 – July 1806)
 War of the Fourth Coalition (October 1806 – July 1807)
 War of the Fifth Coalition (April – October 1809)
 War of the Sixth Coalition (March 1813 – May 1814)
 War of the Seventh Coalition, also known as the Hundred Days (March – July 1815)

Although the Coalition Wars are the most prominent subset of conflicts of this era, some French Revolutionary Wars such as the French invasion of Switzerland (1798), and some Napoleonic Wars such as the French invasion of Russia (June – December 1812) and the Peninsular War (October 1807 – April 1814), are not counted amongst the "Coalition Wars" proper.

Terminology

Etymology of Coalition Wars
One of the first usages of the term "Coalition Wars" can be found in the 1803 Tribunat report, titled Résultats des guerres, des négociations et des traités qui ont préced́é et suivi la coalition contre la France ("Results of the Wars, Negotiations and Treaties that preceded and followed the Coalition against France"). About the situation in April 1793, when General Dumouriez had just been defeated at Neerwinden and defected to Austria, causing despair in France, it states: "Les événements de cette époque sont les plus pénibles à décrire de tous ceux qui ont signalé les guerres de la coalition." ("The events of that time are the most painful to describe of all those that marked the wars of the coalition." [emphasis added]).

In January 1805, the Salzburger Intelligenzblatt was one of the first to number the Coalition Wars when it discussed "Das Staatsinteresse von Baiern bei dem dritten Koalitions-Kriege" ("The national interest of Bavaria in the Third Coalition War"). Although the Third Coalition had been formed by that time, war had not yet broken out; the Austrian newspaper discussed why the neighbouring Electorate of Bavaria was likely to side with the French Empire rather than the Austrian-led Coalition. On 30 September 1805, a few days after the launch of the Ulm Campaign, Emperor Napoleon addressed his troops in Strasbourg, starting his speech with the words: "Soldats, la guerre de la troisième coalition est commencée." ("Soldiers, the war of the third coalition has begun.")

Compared to other terms 
The term is distinct from "French Revolutionary Wars", which covers any war involving Revolutionary France between 1792 and 1799, when Napoleon seized power with the Coup of 18 Brumaire (9 November 1799), which is usually considered the end of the French Revolution. Since the War of the Second Coalition (1798–1802) had already begun when Napoleon seized power, the war as a whole may or may not be counted amongst the French Revolutionary Wars, which therefore may end in 1799, 1801 (Treaty of Lunéville), or 1802 (Treaty of Amiens).

It also differs from "Napoleonic Wars", which is variously defined as covering any war involving France ruled by Napoleon between 1799 and 1815 (which includes the War of the Second Coalition, 1798–1802), or not commencing until the War of the Third Coalition (1803/05, depending on periodisation). In the latter case, historians do not term the War of the Second Coalition "Napoleonic", since Napoleon did not initiate it himself, but merely "inherited" it from the Revolutionary French Directory which he overthrew during the war.

Because it only pertains to wars involving any of the Coalition parties, not all wars counted amongst the French Revolutionary and Napoleonic Wars are considered "Coalition Wars". For example, the French invasion of Switzerland (1798, between the First and Second Coalition), the Stecklikrieg (1802, between the Second and Third Coalition), the Peninsular War (1807-1814) and the French invasion of Russia (1812, between the Fifth and Sixth Coalition) were not assigned to the "Coalition Wars".

History

Coalition parties 
The main European powers who forged the various anti-French Coalitions were Great Britain, Russia, Austria, and Prussia, although except for Great Britain not all of them were involved in every Coalition. Smaller powers that occasionally joined the Coalitions include Spain, Naples, Piedmont–Sardinia, the Dutch Republic, the Ottoman Empire, Portugal, Sweden, Denmark–Norway, and various German and Italian states. The First until Fifth Coalitions fell apart when one or more parties were defeated by France and were forced to leave the alliance, and sometimes became French allies; the Sixth and Seventh were dissolved after Napoleon was defeated in 1814 and 1815 and a new balance of power was established between the parties at the Congress of Vienna.

See also 
 Lists of battles of the French Revolutionary Wars and Napoleonic Wars
 Coalition forces of the Napoleonic Wars
 Ireland in the Coalition Wars

Notes

References

Bibliography 
 
 

 
History of Europe